Pribilci is a village in the municipality of Demir Hisar, North Macedonia.

Demographics
In statistics gathered by Vasil Kanchov in 1900, the village of Pribilci was inhabited by 450 Muslim Albanians.

According to the 2002 census, the village had a total of 266 inhabitants. Ethnic groups in the village include:

Macedonians 266

References

Villages in Demir Hisar Municipality